Pleasant Valley is an unincorporated community in Springfield Township, Bucks County, Pennsylvania, United States.

History
Prior to European settlement, the area was inhabited by the Lenape people. Its first name was Schuckenhausen, the name of the first church in this location constructed as a log building. In 1872, it was replaced by a stone church known as the Union Church, later becoming a dwelling. The oldest building is the Pleasant Valley Inn, now out of business. General Lafayette stopped at the inn on the way to a hospital in Bethlehem after being wounded in the Battle of Brandywine. The village was built upon two farms, one owned by Jacob Smith and the other John J. Ott. the name was changed to Pleasant Valley when the post office was established on September 15, 1828, by Lewis Ott, first postmaster.

Pleasant Valley was entered into the Geographic Names Information System of the United States Geological Survey on 2 August 1979 as identification number 1184062.

Geography
Pleasant Valley is located between three nearby summits, Cressman Hill  to the southeast (elevation ), Molasses Hill  to the east (elevation ) and The Lookout  to the west (elevation . Cooks Creek, part of the Delaware River watershed, passes just south of the community.

Geology
Pleasant Valley is located within the Brunswick Formation laid during the Triassic, consisting of mudstone, siltstone as well as brown, green and reddish-brown shale.

References

Unincorporated communities in Bucks County, Pennsylvania
Unincorporated communities in Pennsylvania